Nayika Sangbad is a 1967 Indian Bengali-language romantic comedy film directed by Agradoot and written by Prasanta Deb. The film stars Uttam Kumar and Anjana Bhowmick. It was remade in Tamil as Sumathi En Sundari (1971).

Plot 

Urmila, a popular film actress, accidentally misses a train somewhere in the midway to her new shooting spot. She takes shelter in the quarter of the station master Alok for the next few days and falls in love with the new place as well as its people.

Cast 
 Uttam Kumar as Alok
 Anjana Bhowmick as Urmila
 Pahari Sanyal as Lahiri
 Anubha Gupta as Rama 
 Mrinal Mukherjee

Production 
Nayika Sangbad was produced under B. K. Productions, directed by Agradoot and written by Prasanta Deb. Cinematography was handled by Bibhuti Laha, and editing by Baidyanath Chattopadhyay. The film was shot in black and white, and contained on 14 reels.

Soundtrack 
The music was composed by Hemant Kumar.

Other versions 
Nayika Sangbad was remade in Tamil as Sumathi En Sundari (1971). The 2013 film Nayika Sangbad has no relation to its 1967 namesake apart from involving the same premise of a film actress disappearing.

References

External links 
 

1960s Bengali-language films
1967 films
1967 romantic comedy films
Bengali films remade in other languages
Bengali-language Indian films
Films directed by Agradoot
Indian romantic comedy films